"Ancrene Wisse and Hali Meiðhad" is a 1929 essay by J. R. R. Tolkien on the thirteenth century Middle English treatise Ancrene Wisse ("The Anchoresses' Rule") and on the tract on virginity Hali Meiðhad ("Holy Maidenhood"). The essay has been called "the most perfect of Tolkien's academic pieces".  Tolkien and Ker later (in 1962) edited a volume of the text for the Early English Text Society.

References

1929 essays
Essays about literature
Essays by J. R. R. Tolkien
Middle English
Works about philology
Works about the Middle Ages
Works originally published in British magazines